Richard Oblitey Solomon is a Ghanaian lawyer, diplomat and football executive. He was Ghana's ambassador to Equatorial Guinea from 2006 to 2009.

Early life
Solomon had his secondary education at the Accra Academy, where he graduated in 1976. He then proceeded to the University of Ghana to pursue a bachelor's degree in law. He then continued to the Ghana School of Law, where he qualified as a barrister-at-law in 1986. He holds a postgraduate diploma in Oil and Gas Law from the Robert Gordon University, and an LLM from the University of Law in the United Kingdom.

Career
Solomon begun as the Greater Accra second Vice Regional Chairman and later first Vice Regional Chairman of the New Patriotic Party in the early 2000s. In 2006, he was appointed Ghana's ambassador to Equatorial Guinea. He served in this capacity until 2009. He was succeeded by Dominic Aboagye.

As a sports fanatic, Solomon was the head of the management board of the Accra Great Olympics F. C. in 2002, and later chairman of the club prior to his ambassadorial appointment. He was made a member of the club's board once more in 2020 when the board of the club was reconstituted.

Solomon has been Vice Chairman of the board of governors of Accra Academy.

Solomon also serves on the board of the Coastal Development Authority (CODA), and the principal of R. O. Solomon Consulting, a law firm in Accra.

References 

20th-century Ghanaian lawyers
People from Accra
Ga-Adangbe people
Alumni of the Accra Academy
University of Ghana alumni
Alumni of Robert Gordon University
Alumni of The University of Law
Ghanaian civil servants
1956 births
Living people
Ambassadors of Ghana to Equatorial Guinea